Modolo is a comune (municipality) in the Province of Oristano in the Italian region Sardinia, located about  northwest of Cagliari and about  north of Oristano.

Modolo borders the following municipalities: Bosa, Flussio, Magomadas, Suni.

Demographic evolution

References

Cities and towns in Sardinia